The Anglican Church of St Michael at Brimpsfield in the Cotswold District of Gloucestershire, England was built in 12th century. It is a grade I listed building.

History

The church was first constructed in the 12th century with the chancel being added in the 13th. The tower was built in the 15th century.

The church belonged to a convent at Fontenay  in France and then Eton College.

Between 1833 and 1883 the church had a west gallery.

The parish and benefice are now part of the Diocese of Gloucester.

Architecture

The limestone building has stone slate roofs. It consists of a nave, chancel, vestry and porch with a tower at the eastern end. On the well of the south doorway is a mass dial. The tower holds six bells. One of the bells is from the 15th century and another from the 16th.

Inside the church is an octagonal pulpit from 1658.

References

Brimpsfield
Brimpsfield